Jeffrey Clayton Collier (October 5, 1954 – June 28, 2021) was an American race car driver. He drove in the NASCAR Dash Series from 1988 to 1994. On February 13, 1990, Collier sat on pole for the Florida 200 at Daytona International Speedway with a new track record of 166.553 mph. Collier was driving a 1990 Ford Probe. This record is a World Closed Course Speed Record for non turbo 4-cylinder powered race cars. 

NASCAR ended the Dash Series in January, 2003 and the 1990 track record by Collier remains the fastest qualifying lap officially recorded for a NASCAR sanctioned event at any track for this Series. Unofficially, the Ford Probe driven by Collier was clocked at a private test session conducted by Ford Motor Company at Talladega International Speedway in January, 1992 at an average lap speed of 174.225 mph. 

The record setting car was on display in the International Motorsports Museum in Talladega, Alabama for one year in 1991. It was removed from the museum collection by its owner, Buddy Shavender of Pantego, NC, put in race trim and with Collier at the wheel, again sat on pole at Daytona in 1992 for the Florida 200. After two Daytona poles, a NASCAR Dash Series record and a World record, the Ford Probe driven by Collier was retired from competition. The car is now housed in a private museum in Pantego, North Carolina. 

Jeffrey Clayton Collier, age 66, his loving wife Cindy, age 63, and friend Dwight Moss, age 65, were all killed in a car accident in Murfreesboro, NC on June 28, 2021.

A highlight to his career, his car is scheduled to placed in the NASCAR Hall of Fame. Date to be determined.

As an anecdote since knowing him on a personal level, Jeff was a warm and caring person who would go out of his way to help you, Rest In Peace!

References

Living people
1954 births
Sportspeople from Raleigh, North Carolina
Racing drivers from North Carolina
ISCARS Dash Touring Series drivers
NASCAR drivers